Luifer Enrique Hernández Quintero (born 28 April 2001) is a Venezuelan professional footballer who plays as a forward for Academia Puerto Cabello in the Venezuelan Primera División.

Club career
A graduate of the Academia Puerto Cabello youth academy, Hernández made his competitive debut for the club on 9 May 2018 in a 1-0 league victory over Monagas.

References

External links
 
 

2001 births
Living people
Venezuelan Primera División players
Venezuelan footballers
Association football forwards
Academia Puerto Cabello players
People from Puerto Cabello